Danieal LaCraig Manning (born August 9, 1982) is a former American football safety. He was drafted by the Chicago Bears in the second round of the 2006 NFL Draft. He played college football at Abilene Christian.

High school career
Before college, he was a highly touted defensive back at Corsicana High School in Corsicana, Texas. 
A three-year starter, as a senior he totaled 67 tackles, three interceptions and three blocked kicks and was named second-team all-state by the Associated Press and the Texas Sports Writers Association. He also starred in track, finishing second in the state in Class 4A in both the 100-meter dash and triple jump

College career
Manning originally signed with the University of Nebraska, but he never enrolled there, choosing to attend Abilene Christian University. For the Abilene Christian Wildcats football, as a sophomore he was named Division II third-team All-American at defensive back, as a junior first-team All-American as a return specialist, and as a senior first-team All-American as a defensive back.

Professional career
Manning was ranked as the ninth best safety available in the 2006 NFL Draft by Sports Illustrated.

Chicago Bears
The Chicago Bears selected Manning in the second round (42nd overall) of the 2006 NFL Draft. He was the highest selection from Abilene Christian University since Johnny Perkins in 1977) and was also the first player from a non-Division I in 2006.

Midway through the 2008 NFL season, Manning took over Devin Hester's duties as the Bears' kick returner. On December 11, 2008, he returned a kickoff 83 yards for a touchdown, making it the first regular season opening kickoff returned for a touchdown for the Bears since 1972. A week before this touchdown, Manning picked off David Garrard's pass on the Jaguars opening drive, and returned it to the Jaguars five-yard line.

Manning led the league in return average and number of 30+-yard returns, despite only starting half the season.
Manning was Bears starting nickelback in 2008, and  competed with Josh Bullocks, Corey Graham, Kevin Payne, and Craig Steltz for starting free safety. Manning won the starting position before the start of the Bears 2009 summer training camp. On passing downs, Manning played nickelback, while Steltz filled in for him at free safety. Due to Manning's larger role on defense, the Bears chose second-year wide receiver Johnny Knox to take over kick-returning duties.

Houston Texans
Manning signed a four-year, $20 million contract (with $9 million guaranteed) with the Houston Texans on July 28, 2011.

In week 4 of the 2012 season, Manning intercepted Tennessee Titans quarterback Matt Hasselbeck and returned it 55 yards for the first defensive touchdown of his career.

On March 31, 2014, Manning was released by the Texans.

Cincinnati Bengals
On April 3, 2014, Manning signed a one-year deal with the Cincinnati Bengals.

Second stint with Texans
On September 1, 2014 Manning signed with the Houston Texans.

Retirement

Manning announced his retirement from the NFL on July 14, 2015.

Coaching

On December 18, Manning announced he would be returning to his Alma Mater Abilene Christian as an assistant coach on Adam Dorrel's staff.

NFL statistics

Key
 GP: games played
 COMB: combined tackles
 TOTAL: total tackles
 AST: assisted tackles
 SACK: sacks
 FF: forced fumbles
 FR: fumble recoveries
 FR YDS: fumble return yards 
 INT: interceptions
 IR YDS: interception return yards
 AVG IR: average interception return
 LNG: longest interception return
 TD: interceptions returned for touchdown
 PD: passes defensed

References

External links

Cincinnati Bengals bio
Houston Texans bio
Abilene Christian Wildcats bio

Living people
1982 births
Abilene Christian Wildcats football players
American football cornerbacks
American football safeties
Chicago Bears players
Cincinnati Bengals players
Houston Texans players
People from Corsicana, Texas
Sportspeople from Abilene, Texas